Carioca ( or ) is a demonym used to refer to anything related to the City of Rio de Janeiro, in Brazil. The original meaning of the term is controversial, maybe from Tupi language "kari' oka", meaning "white house" as the whitewashed stone houses of European settlers or even the colonists themselves, by merging "kara'iwa" (white man) and "oka" (house). Currently, the more accepted origin in academia is the meaning derived from "kariîó oka", which comes from the indigenous tupi "house of carijó", which was Guaraní, a native tribe of Rio de Janeiro who lived in the vicinity of the Carioca River, between the neighborhoods of Glória and Flamengo.
 
Like other Brazilians, cariocas speak Portuguese. The carioca accent and sociolect (also simply called "carioca", see below) are one of the most widely recognized in Brazil, in part because TV Globo, the second-largest television network in the world, is headquartered in Rio de Janeiro. Thus, many Brazilian TV programs, from news and documentary to entertainment (such as the telenovelas), feature carioca-acting and -speaking talent.

History

The archaic demonym for the Rio de Janeiro State is fluminense, taken from the Latin word flūmen, meaning "river." Despite the fact that carioca is a more ancient demonym of Rio de Janeiro's inhabitants (known since 1502), it was replaced by fluminense in 1783, when the latter was sanctioned as the official demonym of the Royal Captainship of Rio de Janeiro (later the Province of Rio de Janeiro). A few years after the City of São Sebastião do Rio de Janeiro had become the capital city of the Brazilian colonies. From 1783 and during all the Imperial Regime, carioca remained only as a nickname by which other Brazilians called the inhabitants of Rio (city and province). During the first years of the Brazilian Republic, carioca was the name given to those who lived in the slums or a pejorative way to refer to the bureaucratic elite of the Federal District. Only when the City of Rio lost its status as Federal District and became a Brazilian State (Guanabara State), when the capital city was moved to Brasilia, was carioca made a co-official demonym with guanabarino. In 1975, the Guanabara State was eliminated by President Geisel (under the military dictatorship), becoming the present-day City of Rio de Janeiro, and carioca was made the demonym of its municipality. Despite the fact carioca is not recognized as an official demonym of Rio de Janeiro State, Brazilians call the inhabitants of Rio de Janeiro in general (state and city) cariocas, and most of its inhabitants claim to be cariocas. Nowadays, social movements like "Somos Todos Cariocas" ("We are all Cariocas") try to achieve the official recognition of carioca as a co-official demonym of the Rio de Janeiro State.

Accomplishments and influence

Carioca people have invented a few sports; the most famous is footvolley.

Cariocas are credited with creating the bossa nova style of music.

Famous cariocas in film include "Brazilian bombshell" Carmen Miranda, a Portuguese-born Brazilian woman who grew up in Rio de Janeiro. An eponymous song from 1933, Carioca, has become a jazz standard.
 
Carnaval Carioca is the Portuguese name for the largest Brazilian Carnival, the Rio Carnival.

Samba Carioca is a localized style of Brazilian Samba.
 
There is an exercise drill used for dynamic stretching called Carioca. It consists of a repeating Samba dance step.

Sociolect  

The Portuguese spoken across the states of Rio de Janeiro and Espírito Santo and neighboring towns in Minas Gerais (and to a certain extent the city of Florianópolis), has similar features, hardly different from one another so cities such as Paraty, Resende, Campos dos Goytacazes, Cachoeiro de Itapemirim, Vila Velha and Linhares may be said to have the same dialect as Rio de Janeiro, as they are hardly perceived as strong regional variants by people from other parts of Brazil.

The Brazilian Portuguese variant spoken in the city of Rio de Janeiro (and metropolitan area) is called , and it is called  locally, literally translated as "accent". It can be said that Rio de Janeiro presents a sociolect inside the major Fluminense-Capixaba dialect, as speakers inside the city may be easily recognizable more by their slang than the way the phonology of their speech, which is closer to the standard Brazilian Portuguese in the media than other variants. It is known especially for several distinctive traits new to either variant (European or Brazilian) of the Portuguese language:

That is inherited from European Portuguese, and Carioca shares it only with Florianopolitano and some other Fluminense accents. In the northern tones of Brazilian Portuguese, not all coda  and  become postalveolar.
 (for Europeans) , as well what would be coda  (when it is not pre-vocalic) in European Portuguese, may be realized as various voiceless and voiced guttural-like sounds, most often the latter (unlike in other parts of Brazil), and many or most of them can be part of the phonetic repertory of a single speaker. That diversity of allophones of a single rhotic phoneme is rare not just in Brazilian Portuguese but among world languages.
It is not as universal in São Paulo, Espírito Santo and southern Brazil even though they were populated mostly by the original bandeirantes (caboclos, formerly Língua Geral speakers) because the European immigrants learning Portuguese and their descendants preferred more conservative registers of the language, perhaps as a mark of a separate social identity. The Northeast had Nheengatu, another Língua Geral, too, but it had a greater native Portuguese-speaker presence, had a greater contact with the colonial metropolis and was more densely populated.

The chiado of the coda sibilant is thought to date from the early 1800s occupation of the city by the Portuguese royal family, as European Portuguese had a similar characteristic for the postalveolar codas.

More recently, however, all of the traits have spread throughout much of the country by the cultural influence of the city that diminished the social marker character the lack of palatalization once had (apart of assimilation of the caboclo minorities in most of South and Southeast Brazil). Affrication is today widespread, if not nearly omnipresent among young Brazilians, and coda guttural r is also found nationwide (their presence in Brazil is a general heritage of Tupi speech too) but less among speakers in the 5 southernmost states other than Rio de Janeiro, and if accent is a good social indicator,  95-105 million Brazilians consistently palatalize coda sibilant in some instances (but as in Rio de Janeiro, it is only a marker of adoption of foreign phonology at large in Florianópolis and Belém: palatalization, as in any other Romance language, is a very old process in Portuguese and its lacking in some dialect rather than reflecting a specific set of Galician, Spanish and indigenous influences on their formation).

Another common characteristic of Carioca speech is, in a stressed final syllable, the addition of /j/ before coda /s/ (mas, dez may become , which can also be noted ambiguously as ). The change may have originated in the Northeast, where pronunciations such as Jesus  have long been heard. Also immigration from Northeastern Brazil and Spanish immigration causes debuccalization of the coda sibilant: mesmo .

There are some grammatical characteristics of this sociolect as well, an important one is the mixing of second person pronouns você and tu, even in the same speech. For instance, while normative Portuguese requires lhe as the oblique for você and te as oblique for tu, in Carioca slang, the once formal você (now widespread as an informal pronoun in many Brazilian Portuguese varieties) is used for all cases. In informal speech, the pronoun tu is retained, but with the verb forms belonging to the form você: Tu foi na festa? ("Did you go to the party?"). So the verbal forms are the same for both você and tu.

Many Cariocas and many Paulistas (from the coast, capital city or hinterland) shorten você and use cê instead: Cê vai pra casa agora? ("Are you going home now?"). That, however, is common only on the spoken language and is rarely written.

Slang words among youngsters from Rio de Janeiro include caraca! (gosh!) [now spread throughout Brazil], e aê? and qualé/quaé/coé? (literally "which is [it]", carrying a meaning similar to "What's up?"), maneiro ("cool", "fine", "interesting", "amusing"), mermão ("bro", contraction of meu irmão), caô (a lie), and sinistro (in standard Portuguese, "sinister"; in slang, "awesome," "terrific," but also "terrible," "troublesome," "frightening," "weird"). Many of these slang words can be found in practically all of Brazil by to cultural influence from the city. Much slang from Rio de Janeiro spreads across Brazil and may be not known as originally from there, and those less culturally accepted elsewhere are sometimes used to shun not only the speech of a certain subculture, age group or social class but also the whole accent.

References

Bibliography 

Rio de Janeiro (city)
Brazilian Portuguese
Demonyms
16th-century neologisms